Patrick Green VC (1824 – 19 July 1889) was born in Ballinasloe, County Galway and  was an Irish recipient of the Victoria Cross, the highest and most prestigious award for gallantry in the face of the enemy that can be awarded to British and Commonwealth forces.

Details
He was approximately 33 years old, and a private in the 75th Regiment of Foot (later The Gordon Highlanders), British Army during the Indian Mutiny when the following deed took place on 11 September 1857 at Delhi, India, for which he was awarded the VC.

He later achieved the rank of colour-sergeant. He died in Cork.

References

The Register of the Victoria Cross (1981, 1988 and 1997)

Ireland's VCs  (Dept of Economic Development 1995)
Monuments to Courage (David Harvey, 1999)
Irish Winners of the Victoria Cross (Richard Doherty & David Truesdale, Four Courts, 2000 )

External links
Location of grave and VC medal (Co. Cork)

1824 births
1889 deaths
British Army recipients of the Victoria Cross
Gordon Highlanders soldiers
Indian Rebellion of 1857 recipients of the Victoria Cross
Irish recipients of the Victoria Cross
Irish soldiers in the British Army
People from Ballinasloe
19th-century Irish people
Military personnel from County Galway